The 1990 UC Davis football team represented the University of California, Davis as a member of the Northern California Athletic Conference (NCAC) during the 1990 NCAA Division II football season. Led by second-year head coach Bob Foster, the Aggies compiled an overall record of 7–3 with a mark of 5–0 in conference play, winning the NCAC title for the 20th consecutive season. 1990 was the 21st consecutive winning season for the Aggies, and their 5–0 record in NCAC play extended the team's conference winning streak to 51 games dating back to the 1981 season. UC Davis outscored its opponents 234 to 166 for the season. The Aggies played home games at Toomey Field in Davis, California.

Schedule

NFL Draft
The following UC Davis Aggies players were selected in the 1991 NFL Draft.

References

UC Davis
UC Davis Aggies football seasons
Northern California Athletic Conference football champion seasons
UC Davis Aggies football